Robert Wade Niedermayer Jr. (born December 28, 1974) is a Canadian former professional ice hockey player who played 17 National Hockey League (NHL) seasons for the Florida Panthers, Calgary Flames, Anaheim Ducks, New Jersey Devils, and Buffalo Sabres.

He is the younger brother of former NHL defenceman Scott Niedermayer (the two were teammates for four seasons), and cousin of defenceman Jason Strudwick. Born in Cassiar, British Columbia, he and his brother Scott grew up in Cranbrook.

Playing career
Niedermayer was drafted fifth overall by the Florida Panthers in the 1993 NHL Entry Draft. At the time, he was playing for the Medicine Hat Tigers of the Western Hockey League (WHL). He began his NHL career immediately following his draft, without playing a game in the minors. During the 1995–96 season, he set career highs in goals, assists and points in the regular season. In the 1996 Stanley Cup playoffs, the Panthers went on an improbable playoff drive to the Stanley Cup Finals before being swept in four games by the Colorado Avalanche. Niedermayer was hurt by concussions in the next years and was never able to achieve the same level of scoring ability again. His NHL role soon turned into a defensive forward.

On July 23, 2001, Niedermayer was traded to the Calgary Flames (alongside a draft pick) in exchange for Valeri Bure and Jason Wiemer. At the 2003 NHL trade deadline, he was sent to the Mighty Ducks of Anaheim. That same year, he helped the Anaheim Ducks make an improbable run to the Stanley Cup Finals, his second such run. But again, Niedermayer's team lost, although this time it was in seven games to his brother's team, the New Jersey Devils. He and Scott became the first set of brothers to play against each other in the Stanley Cup Final since Ken and Terry Reardon did it in 1946. In the summer of 2005, Rob's brother Scott was signed by the Mighty Ducks, and for the first time in their NHL careers, the two brothers were playing on the same team.

He and his brother Scott (by this point captain of the Ducks, with Rob as an alternate) won the Stanley Cup together as members of the Anaheim Ducks after defeating the Ottawa Senators four games to one in 2007, becoming the first brothers to win the Stanley Cup together since Duane and Brent Sutter accomplished the feat twice with the New York Islanders in 1982 and 1983. After Scott took the first lap around the ice with the Stanley Cup, he handed it to Rob. This was a break with Stanley Cup tradition; normally, the alternate captain who has waited longest to win the Cup (in the 2006–07 Ducks' case, Chris Pronger and Teemu Selänne) takes the next lap after the captain takes his lap.

On September 25, 2009, Niedermayer was signed by the New Jersey Devils, a team his brother Scott played on for 14 NHL seasons. On July 7, 2010, Niedermayer was signed by the Buffalo Sabres to a one-year contract worth a reported $1.15 million.

After becoming a free agent following the 2011 season, Niedermayer signed with HC Lugano of the Swiss National League A.

Personal
On July 16, 2006, Niedermayer married longtime girlfriend Jessica Bentall, daughter of Barney Bentall, whom he had been dating since March 2001. Together, they have three daughters.

Niedermayer was a minority owner of major junior club the Kootenay Ice in the WHL for 18 years before selling his stake (along with brother Scott) to the Chynoweth family after the 2015–16 season.

Career statistics

Regular season and playoffs

International

Awards and honours

Transactions
 June 26, 1993 – drafted by the Florida Panthers in the first round, fifth overall in the 1993 NHL Entry Draft
 June 23, 2001 – traded to the Calgary Flames with a 2001 second round draft pick (Andrei Medvedev) for Valeri Bure and Jason Wiemer
 March 11, 2003 – traded to the Mighty Ducks of Anaheim for Jean-François Damphousse and Mike Commodore
 September 25, 2009 – signed by the New Jersey Devils as an unrestricted free agent
 July 7, 2010 – signed by the Buffalo Sabres as an unrestricted free agent

See also
Notable families in the NHL
List of NHL players with 1,000 games played

References

 2005 NHL Official Guide & Record Book;

External links

 
 

1974 births
Living people
Anaheim Ducks players
Buffalo Sabres players
Calgary Flames players
Canadian ice hockey forwards
Canadian people of German descent
Ferencvárosi TC (ice hockey) players
Florida Panthers draft picks
Florida Panthers players
HC Lugano players
Ice hockey people from British Columbia
Medicine Hat Tigers players
Mighty Ducks of Anaheim players
National Hockey League first-round draft picks
New Jersey Devils players
Sportspeople from Cranbrook, British Columbia
Stanley Cup champions
Canadian expatriate ice hockey players in Switzerland